Richard Richmond, LL.D. (died 1780) was an Anglican clergyman who served in the Church of England as the Bishop of Sodor and Man from 1773 to 1780.

He was nominated Bishop of Sodor and Man by John Murray, 3rd Duke of Atholl and Charlotte Murray, Duchess of Atholl on 23 January 1773, and was consecrated on 14 February 1773.

He died in office on 4 February 1780.

References

 
 
 
 
 

1780 deaths
18th-century Church of England bishops
Bishops of Sodor and Man
Year of birth unknown